Ivan Aleksandrovich Ignatyev (born 6 January 1999) is a Russian professional footballer who plays as a striker for FC Lokomotiv Moscow.

Club career
He made his debut in the Russian Professional Football League for FC Krasnodar-2 on 3 May 2016 in a game against FC Chernomorets Novorossiysk.

He made his debut for the main squad of FC Krasnodar on 27 July 2017 in an 2017–18 UEFA Europa League third qualifying round game against Lyngby.

On his Russian Premier League debut on 10 August 2017, he scored a goal in added time to give Krasnodar a 3–2 victory over FC Akhmat Grozny.

On his second UEFA Europa League appearance, he scored his first Europa League goal which helped his team to a 3–2 victory vs Red Star Belgrade.

When Fyodor Smolov, the top scorer of the Russian Premier League for two seasons running, recovered from the injury he was suffering from in the beginning of the 2017–18 season and moved back into the lineup, Ignatyev was moved back into the Krasnodar's junior squad. He continued to score prolifically there, including 16 goals in 12 games for the Under-21 squad and 10 goals in the 2017–18 UEFA Youth League, including 5 in one game and 4 in another, making him the top scorer of that competition at the winter break. Ignatyev started the next Russian Premier League game that Smolov was given rest for, against FC Amkar Perm on 10 December 2017, and scored his second league goal in his team's 3–1 victory.

On 28 December 2019, he signed a contract with FC Rubin Kazan until 30 May 2024.

On 2 February 2022, Ignatyev moved to Krylia Sovetov Samara on loan until the end of the 2021–22 season, with an option to buy.

Ignatyev's contract with Rubin was terminated by mutual consent on 27 June 2022.

On 21 July 2022, Ignatyev signed with FC Lokomotiv Moscow for the term of one season, with an option to extend for two more. On 28 August 2022, he scored a hat-trick in 11 minutes in the first half of the 5–1 victory over FC Orenburg.

Career statistics

Honours

Individual
UEFA Youth League top goalscorer: 2017–18

References

External links
 

1999 births
People from Achinsk
Sportspeople from Krasnoyarsk Krai
Living people
Russian footballers
Russia youth international footballers
Russia under-21 international footballers
Association football forwards
FC Krasnodar-2 players
FC Krasnodar players
FC Rubin Kazan players
PFC Krylia Sovetov Samara players
FC Lokomotiv Moscow players
Russian Premier League players
Russian First League players
Russian Second League players